Luxembourg competed at the 2016 Winter Youth Olympics in Lillehammer, Norway from 12 to 21 February 2016. The team consisted of one male athlete in alpine skiing.

Competitors

Alpine skiing

Luxembourg qualified one boy.

Boys

See also
Luxembourg at the 2016 Summer Olympics

References

Nations at the 2016 Winter Youth Olympics
Luxembourg at the Youth Olympics
2016 in Luxembourgian sport